Miholjački Poreč  is a village in the region of Osijek-Baranja in Croatia.

References

Populated places in Osijek-Baranja County